Heedless Moths is a 1921 American silent melodrama film written and directed by Robert Z. Leonard. The film stars Jane Thomas as real life nude model Audrey Munson. Munson appeared as herself in the nude scenes, which were posed similar to tableau vivants, and the film was based on a series of autobiographical stories she wrote. Heedless Moths also stars Holmes Herbert and Hedda Hopper.

Plot
As described in a film publication, idealistic sculptor (Herbert), who has a "butterfly" wife (Hopper), is working on a nude group from life. He and his model (Munson/Thomas) fall in love, but it is not a love to be realized. In the meantime the butterfly wife has become enmeshed in the nets of a dilettante artist (Crane). One night he pulls in the nets and she finds herself in his apartment. When the model realizes the sculptor is searching for his wife, she breaks into the dilettante's apartment, hides the wife, and plays the role of the reveler, saving the marriage of the man she loves.

Cast

 Jane Thomas as Audrey Munson 
 Holmes Herbert as The Sculptor
 Hedda Hopper as His Wife
 Ward Crane as The Dilettante
 Tom Burrough as The Sage
 Audrey Munson as herself
 Henry Duggan as The Spirit of the Arch
 Irma Harrison as The Prey

Production
The working title of the film was The Soul Within.

Reception
Upon its release, Heedless Moths was generally panned by critics. The film magazine Photoplay in an editorial note recommended that the film not be seen as it would add to calls for film censorship.

Munson later sued the film's production company, Perry Plays, and producer Alan Rock for $15,000 in damages after they chose to send Jane Thomas on a tour to promote the film instead of Munson.

Preservation
With no copies of Heedless Moths listed as being in any film archives, it is a lost film.

References

External links

1921 films
1921 drama films
1921 lost films
Silent American drama films
American silent feature films
American black-and-white films
Films directed by Robert Z. Leonard
American independent films
Lost American films
Lost drama films
Melodrama films
1920s independent films
1920s American films